Herbert Riehl (March 30, 1915 – June 1, 1997) was a German-born American meteorologist who is widely regarded as the father of tropical meteorology. He is well known for his work with Joanne Simpson on the importance of hot towers, and their critical role in transport of energy out of the tropics via the Hadley circulation. He was responsible for founding the atmospheric science department at Colorado State University.

Awards
 American Meteorological Society's Clarence Leroy Meisinger Award (1947)
 American Institute for Aeronautics and Astronautics Losey Award (1962) 
 American Meteorological Society Carl-Gustaf Rossby Research Medal (1979)

Riehl wrote the first textbook on tropical meteorology.

References 

 

Tropical meteorology
American meteorologists
1915 births
1997 deaths
New York University alumni
University of Chicago alumni
University of Chicago faculty
Colorado State University faculty
Carl-Gustaf Rossby Research Medal recipients
Jewish emigrants from Nazi Germany to the United States